Liuwu New Area or Niu New Area, officially Liuwu Subdistrict or Niu Subdistrict, is a subdivision of Doilungdêqên of Lhasa, Tibet in Western China. The Liuwu New Area is located southwest of downtown Chengguan, the old center of Lhasa.

The Liuwu Bridge links central Lhasa to Lhasa railway station and the Liuwu New Area on the south bank of the Lhasa River. Residents in the Niu area were resettled to make way for the new development. The  "Liuwu New District" includes new residential buildings. The villagers, numbering almost 1,700, were moved into these buildings. The effect of the railway, bridge and Liuwu New District development has been urbanization and development of new enterprises such as transport, retail outlets and restaurants.
Constructions continues also in recent years.
Niu New Area have serious problems with water supplies.

Transportation 
Lhasa railway station
Lhasa Airport Expressway

References

Sources

External links 
 Liuwu New Area
 https://www.hrw.org/report/2013/06/27/they-say-we-should-be-grateful/mass-rehousing-and-relocation-programs-tibetan “They Say We Should Be Grateful”
Mass Rehousing and Relocation Programs in Tibetan Areas of China

Doilungdêqên District
Populated places in Lhasa (prefecture-level city)
Township-level divisions of Tibet
Subdistricts of the People's Republic of China